Paul Weir (born 16 September 1967) is a Scottish former professional boxer who competed from 1992 to 2000. He was a world champion in two weight classes, having held the WBO mini-flyweight title in 1993 and the WBO junior-flyweight title from 1994 to 1995.

Amateur career 

Western District Champion 1986
Scottish Champion 1989, 1990, 1991
1989 Diamond Jubilee (Gold Medal – Belfast)
1990 ABA Final
1990 Commonwealth Games (Auckland)
1990 Canada Cup (Bronze Medal)
1990 World Cup (Bombay)
1991 European Championships (Bronze Medal – Gothenburg)
1991 Canada Cup (Bronze Medal)
1991 World Championships (Sydney), fought against Ireland, England, Wales, USA, East Germany.

Brazillian Jiu Jitsu
 2022 received BJJ Black Belt

Professional career 

Weir turned professional in 1992 and captured the vacant WBO mini-flyweight title in his sixth professional fight, with a TKO win over Fernando Martínez in 1993. He defended the belt once against Lindi Memani and relinquished the belt before moving up in weight to challenge Josue Camacho for the WBO junior-flyweight title. He lost the bout, but Camacho vacated the belt and he defeated Paul Oulden for the vacant WBO junior-flyweight title in 1994. He defended the belt once against Ric Magramo before losing it to Jacob Matlala after Weir was unable to continue due to a deep cut from an accidental headbutt in the fifth round. They rematched the following year and Weir lost via TKO in the tenth.

Training career 
In 2010, Weir returned to boxing as a trainer. Weir's fighters include Craig Docherty, Kris Hughes, Jonathan Slowey, Jason Hastie, Alexander White, Derry Mathews, and John Simpson.

Professional boxing record

See also 
List of Mini-flyweight boxing champions
List of light-flyweight boxing champions

References

External links 
 
 Personal website

1967 births
Living people
Scottish male boxers
Light-flyweight boxers
World light-flyweight boxing champions
Mini-flyweight boxers
World mini-flyweight boxing champions
Flyweight boxers
World Boxing Organization champions